Aboubacar Tambadou (born 16 January 1987 in Bamako, Mali) is a Malian footballer, who plays in Tunisia for Avenir Sportif de La Marsa.

Career
Tambadou began his career with AS Real Bamako and was signed in January 2008 for League rival Stade Malien. After two successful seasons with Stade Malien he signed in summer 2009 for Stade Tunisien.

International career
He earned his first call-up in 2008 and made his international debut on 27 April 2009 against Equatorial Guinea national football team

References

1987 births
Living people
Malian footballers
Malian expatriate footballers
Association football midfielders
AS Real Bamako players
Stade Malien players
Stade Tunisien players
AS Marsa players
Al-Karkh SC players
Najran SC players
Tunisian Ligue Professionnelle 1 players
Saudi Professional League players
Expatriate footballers in Tunisia
Expatriate footballers in Iraq
Expatriate footballers in Saudi Arabia
Expatriate footballers in Bahrain
Malian expatriate sportspeople in Saudi Arabia
Malian expatriate sportspeople in Tunisia
Mali international footballers
21st-century Malian people